Poh, POH or pOH may refer to:
 Poh, Hokkien pronunciation of a Chinese surname, a variant of Fu (surname)
 Poh, tenth month in the Nanakshahi calendar
 Poh Ling Yeow (born 1973), a Malaysian-Australian artist and chef
 Pok Oi Hospital, a Hong Kong hospital
 Power-on hours, the length of time, in hours, that electrical power is applied to a device
 POH, Amtrak station code for Port Henry (Amtrak station), New York, United States
 Pilot's Operating Handbook, an aircraft flight manual for a model of aircraft, rather than a specific plane
 A Player-Owned House in RuneScape, which is created by the Construction skill
  pOH, a measure of the concentration of hydroxide ions

See also 
 Po (disambiguation)